Willard Shurtleff Augsbury (August 31, 1858 in Plessis, Jefferson County, New York – August 15, 1939 in Antwerp, Jefferson Co., NY) was an American businessman, banker and politician from New York.

Life
He graduated from Phillips Exeter Academy in 1876. Then he attended Yale College for a year, but left without degree.

He married Mary Ellis (1863–1920), but they had no children. Mary Augsbury was Regent of the New York State Conference of the Daughters of the American Revolution in 1913 and 1914.

Willard Augsbury and his brother Frank established in 1898 the first electric light network in Antwerp. They also established a paper mill, and in 1914 Willard became President of the Bank of Antwerp.

He was a member of the New York State Assembly (Jefferson Co., 2nd D.) in 1915, 1916 and 1917; and a member of the New York State Senate (37th D.) in 1923 and 1924.

He died on August 15, 1939, in Antwerp, New York; and was buried at the Hillside Cemetery there.

Sources

External links
 

1858 births
1939 deaths
Republican Party New York (state) state senators
People from Jefferson County, New York
Republican Party members of the New York State Assembly
American bankers
Yale College alumni